The Thicket is an upcoming western film directed by Elliott Lester and written by Cristopher Kelley. It is a film adaptation of the 2013 novel of the same name by Joe R. Lansdale.  It stars Peter Dinklage (also producer), Juliette Lewis, Esmé Creed-Miles and Levon Hawke.

Premise 
Around the turn of the last century in lawless East Texas, Cut Throat Bill (Lewis) is tracked down into a deadly no-man’s land called 'The Big Thicket' by a young man, Jack, who is aiming to rescue his sister Lula after a kidnapping. Jack bags enlisted a bounty hunter Reginald Jones, and a grave-digging alcoholic son of a slave, and a savvy prostitute.

Cast
 Peter Dinklage as Reginald Jones 
 Juliette Lewis as Cut Throat Bill
 Esmé Creed-Miles as Lula
 Levon Hawke as Jack
 Leslie Grace
 Gbenga Akinnagbe
 Macon Blair
 James Hetfield
 Ned Dennehy
 Andrew Schulz
 Arliss Howard

Production
Peter Dinklage has been attached to the project for many years, being linked with the project in 2014 along with producer Gianni Nunnari. The film has been described as a ‘passion project’ for him. The film began pre-production in February 2020 with Dinklage, Noomi Rapace and Charlie Plummer joining the cast, but was impacted by the Covid-19 pandemic.

Casting
A new cast around Dinklage including Juliette Lewis (replacing Rapace) was announced in March 2023, along with Tubi Films producing and acquiring North American distribution rights. James Hetfield from the band Metallica was confirmed as amongst the cast.

Filming
Principal photography began in Calgary, Canada on March 1 and is expected to conclude on March 29, 2023.

References

External links

2020s American films
2020s English-language films
Upcoming films
Films shot in Canada
Films shot in Alberta
Films shot in Calgary
American Western (genre) films